Látigo (born June 7, 1990 in Naucalpan, Estado de México) is a Mexican luchador, a masked professional wrestler. He is currently working with Lucha Libre AAA Worldwide (AAA) where he wrestles as a rudo (heel), a part of the Los Nuevos Vipers group, based on the original stable Los Vipers.

Career 
Latigo debuted in International Wrestling Revolution Group in 2012. In 2014 IWRG would repackage him as Leo, leader of the Tortugas Ninjas group. Látigo would leave the gimmick some time in 2015. A long time wrestler on the Mexico City independent scene, throughout 2015 and 2016 he would garner attention as a member of the La Mala Hierba stable with Fly Warrior and Centvrion.

In May 2018 he would wrestle his first match in Lucha Libre AAA Worldwide at a taping in Tehuacán. Wrestling another handful of matches for the promotion in 2018 and 2019, he wouldn't become a regular until 2021.

October 9, 2021 at Héroes Inmortales XIV, the Los Nuevos Vipers group was formed, which consisted of Látigo, Abismo Negro Jr., Arez, Chik Tormenta and with Psicosis as a mentor.

After getting a work visa, Látigo made his United States debut in Garden State Pro Wrestling in August 27, 2022. With fellow Vipers member Arez, the team defeated Big Lucha wrestlers Elemental and El Bendito. He would regularly make appearences for Game Changer Wrestling throughout 2022 and made his debut for Pro Wrestling Guerrilla at the event DINK on November 6.

Shortly after, Latigo would be invited to participate in the Pro Wrestling Guerrillas Battle of Los Angeles event January 7-8, 2023. He lost his first round match to fellow luchador Komander, but would go on to score a tag team victory along with Black Taurus in an exhibition match against Aramis and Rey Horus on the second night of the event.

References 

1990 births
Living people
Masked wrestlers
Mexican male professional wrestlers
Unidentified wrestlers
People from Naucalpan
21st-century professional wrestlers